Yellow Rat Bastard is the flagship establishment in a chain of New York City retail clothing stores and print magazine owned by Henry Ishay. It specializes in hip hop and alternative-style clothing and shoes.

History
Yellow Rat Bastard (YRB), the word YRB was originally developed by Marc Ecko, a former store manager and the space designer of the New York City store. The idea for the store came from a Frank Miller comic book called "Sin City"; it had an issue entitled "That Yellow Bastard".

Controversy
In 2008, the store, the related chain and owner Ishay were cited for labor law violations by New York Attorney General Andrew Cuomo and entered into $1.4 million settlement paying back wages to more than a thousand employees.

Magazine 
YRB Magazine started as the stores retail catalog and eventually became a national print magazine established in 1999. The magazine focuses on lifestyle, fashion, music and art. It is responsible for the first print cover appearances for Alicia Keys, Channing Tatum, Kim Kardashian and Katy Perry. Jonn Nubian currently serves as partner and Managing Editor.

References

External links
Yellow Rat Bastard

Companies based in New York City
Shops in New York City